

Surname 
Araya, is a Spanish surname of Basque and also Catalan origin. A Japanese surname Araya of unrelated origin also exists, "usually written with characters meaning 'wild valley' or 'new valley'". People with the surname Araya or Araia include:

Felipe Araya (born 1991), Chilean footballer
Francesco Araia (1709–1770?), Italian composer
Guillermo Araya (born 1985), Chilean handball player
Graciela Araya (born 1962), Chilean-born Austrian mezzo-soprano opera singer
Johnny Araya Monge (born 1957), Costa Rican politician
Pedro Araya Toro (born 1942), Chilean footballer
Rayén Araya (born 1981), Chilean radio and television journalist
Rolando Araya Monge (born 1947), Costa Rican socialist politician
Tom Araya (born 1961), Chilean-born American musician, lead singer and bass player with Slayer
, Japanese wushu practitioner
Yerko Araya (born 1986), Chilean racewalker
Zuliana Araya (born 1964), Chilean politician and LGBTQ activist

Given name 
Araya is a Tigray-Tigrinya given name/lineage name. People with this name include:

Araya Desta (born 1945), Eritrean diplomat
Araya A. Hargate (born 1981), Thai actress, model and television personality 
Araya Mengesha (born 1989), Canadian actor
Araya Selassie Yohannes (1867–1888), Ethiopian army commander and nobleman
Gugsa Araya Selassie (1885–1932), son of Araya Selassie Yohannes
Zeudi Araya (born 1951), Eritrean actress

References

Spanish-language surnames
Catalan-language surnames
Basque-language surnames
Japanese-language surnames